"Everytime You Cry" is a song by John Farnham and Human Nature. It was released as the lead single from John Farnham's Anthology 1 and also included on Human Nature's 1999 album, Counting Down. It was nominated for the 1998 ARIA Music award for Highest Selling Single but lost to The Living End's Second Solution / Prisoner of Society. It peaked at No. 3 on the ARIA Singles Chart. "Everytime You Cry" is Human Nature's highest charting single in Australia.

The song was originally recorded during sessions for Romeo's Heart but left unfinished. It was finished for Anthology 1 with additional backing vocal overdubs from Human Nature, who recorded their vocals in London. 

It was nominated for an ARIA Award in 1998, for highest selling single.

Track listing
The CD single was released in 1997.
 "Everytime You Cry" performed by John Farnham & Human Nature 
 "Everything Is Out of Season" performed by John Farnham  
 "You're the Voice" (swing version) performed by John Farnham with Melbourne Symphony Orchestra.

Music video
The video had a retro feel, with a family watching Farnham and Human Nature performing the song on a television set, whilst eating a meal.

Charts

Weekly charts

Year-end chart

Certifications

References

1997 singles
1997 songs
Songs written by Shelly Peiken
Sony BMG singles
John Farnham songs
Human Nature (band) songs
Songs written by Gregg Sutton
Vocal collaborations